is a national highway on the island and prefecture of Hokkaido in northern Japan.  The  highway connects Hakodate and Mori.

See also

References

External links

National highways in Japan
Roads in Hokkaido